Gary Connelly (born December 22, 1950) is a Canadian former professional ice hockey player. During the 1973–74 season, Connelly played 4 games in the World Hockey Association with the Chicago Cougars, scoring no goals and one assist.

References

External links

1950 births
Living people
Anglophone Quebec people
Canadian ice hockey right wingers
Chicago Cougars players
Sportspeople from Rouyn-Noranda
Long Island Cougars players
Michigan Wolverines men's ice hockey players
Montreal Junior Canadiens players
Ice hockey people from Quebec